The BeNeLux Cup was a basketball tournament that was held in 1987–1988. Sunair Oostende won the only edition of the BeNeLux Cup, in which clubs from the Netherlands, Belgium, and Luxembourg participated.

Editions

References

Defunct basketball cup competitions in Europe
International club basketball competitions
1987 establishments in Europe
1988 disestablishments in Europe
1987–88 in European basketball